My Darling, My Dearest is a 1981 Italian comedy film directed by Sergio Corbucci.

Plot

Cast 

 Giancarlo Giannini: Gennarino Laganà
 Mariangela Melato: Armida
 Stefania Sandrelli: Clarabella
 Massimo Mollica: Pappalucerna
 Sal Borgese: Cicciuzzo
 Giuliana Calandra: Zuava
 Enzo Liberti: Commendatore

See also     
 List of Italian films of 1981

References

External links

1981 films
Italian comedy films
Films directed by Sergio Corbucci
Films set in Pescara
Films shot in Pescara
Commedia all'italiana
1981 comedy films
1980s Italian-language films
1980s Italian films